Stephen Allen Hull (June 16, 1878 – October 19, 1973) was an American politician in the state of Washington. He served in the Washington House of Representatives.

References

Republican Party members of the Washington House of Representatives
1878 births
1973 deaths